Pierre Joseph Brésoles, born Claire Brésolles, (10 November 1929 – 13 January 2018) was a French runner who ran the 100 metre and 200 metre races. In the 1950s, Pierre came out as a trans man.

He won 3rd in the 100 meter dash in the Oslo European Championship in 1946.

His teammate Léon Caurla, with whom he broke the 4x100 meter relay record in 1946, also came out as a trans man around this time, and the two became romantic partners.

See also  
 Gender test

References

External links  
 DocAthlé2003, French Athletics Federation, p. 393

1929 births
2018 deaths
French male sprinters
French transgender people
Transgender men
Transgender sportsmen
French LGBT sportspeople
LGBT track and field athletes